The 2002 Swale Borough Council election took place on 2 May 2002 to elect members of Swale Borough Council in Kent, England. The whole council was up for election with boundary changes since the last election in 2000 reducing the number of seats by two. The Conservative Party gained overall control of the council from no overall control.

Election result
The Conservatives gained control of the council after taking 10 seats from the Liberal Democrats. Overall turnout at the election was 31.66%.

Ward results

References

2002
2002 English local elections
2000s in Kent